The 2019 season was Pahang's 16th season in the Malaysian Super League since its inception in 2004.

Management team

Squad

Transfers

In
1st leg

2nd leg

Out
1st leg

2nd leg

Friendlies
Pahang confirmed friendlies against UiTM, Selangor United, Kelantan United, Terengganu II, Visakha, Chonburi and Army United.

Tour of Thailand (7 to 13 Jan 2019)

Competitions

Overview

Malaysia Super League

League table

Results summary

Matches
On 22 December 2018, the Malaysia Super League fixtures for the forthcoming season were announced.

FA Cup

Malaysia Cup

Group stage

Statistics

Appearances and goals
Correct as of match played on 8 August 2019

|-
! colspan="16" style="background:#dcdcdc; text-align:center"| Players transferred out during the season
|-

|}

Goalscorers
Includes all competitive matches.

Clean sheets

Disciplinary record

References

Sri Pahang FC
Sri Pahang FC seasons
2019 in Malaysian football
Malaysian football clubs 2019 season